Alexander Ebenezer McLean Geddes OBE FRSE (8 February 1885-26 December1970) was a Scottish meteorologist and physicist. He was generally known as Sandy Geddes and nicknamed Siccer Sandy (mean Sandy).

Life

He was born in Fordyce, Aberdeenshire on 8 February 1885 and educated at Fordyce Academy. He then attended the University of Aberdeen graduating with a MA in 1906. In 1908 he became an assistant lecturer at the university teaching natural philosophy (Physics). He received a doctorate (DSc) in 1913.

In the First World War he joined the Royal Flying Corps as a meteorologist at the rank of Lieutenant. He was transferred to the Royal Engineers and served in France and Belgium. He rose to the rank of Captain and was three times mentioned in dispatches. He was awarded a military OBE after the war. In 1919 he returned to the University of Aberdeen as a lecturer.

In 1930 he was elected a Fellow of the Royal Society of Edinburgh. His proposers were Archibald Goldie, Sir Ernest Wedderburn, Arthur Crichton Mitchell, and Ralph Allan Sampson.

In 1946 became a Reader. He retired in 1955, and in the same year the university granted him an honorary doctorate (LLD).

He died on 26 December 1970.

Publications

Meteorology: An Introductory Treatise (1921)

References

1885 births
1970 deaths
Fellows of the Royal Society of Edinburgh
British meteorologists
Alumni of the University of Aberdeen
Academics of the University of Aberdeen
People educated at Fordyce Academy
Scottish non-fiction writers